Poliopastea is a genus of tiger moths in the family Erebidae. The genus was erected by George Hampson in 1898.

Species

References

 
Euchromiina
Moth genera